A40 or A-40 may refer to:

Roads 
 A40 motorway (Canada), a road in Québec
 A40 motorway (France)
 A40 motorway (Germany)
 A40 road (Great Britain), a road connecting London and Fishguard, Wales
 A40 road (Northern Ireland), a road running from the L/Derry to Raphoe
 A40 road (Isle of Man), a primary road which connects the A3 with the A1

Other uses 
 A40, a Queen's Pawn Game, Encyclopaedia of Chess Openings code
Antonov A-40, a Soviet flying tank design
Archambault A40, a French sailboat design
Archambault A40RC, a French sailboat design
Austin A40, a car from the British Motor Corporation
 Innocenti A40, variant of the Austin A40 produced by Innocenti
Beriev A-40, an aircraft
Samsung Galaxy A40,  a midrange smartphone by Samsung

See also 
 List of highways numbered 40